Scarecrow, in comics, may refer to:

 Scarecrow (DC Comics), comic book villain in the Batman series by DC Comics
 Scarecrow (Marvel Comics), villain from Marvel Comics who fought heroes such as Spider-Man and Ghost Rider
 Straw Man (comics), Marvel Comics supernatural hero originally named Scarecrow

See also
Scarecrow (disambiguation)